Aedes (Collessius) macdougalli is a species complex of zoophilic mosquito belonging to the genus Aedes. It is found in Sri Lanka, India, China, and Sumatra.

References

External links
Effectiveness of net covers on water storage tanks
A survey of the mosquito fauna (Diptera: Culicidae) of Sinharaja Forest, Sri Lanka.
Mosquito Taxonomic Inventory 

macdougalli